Bolma tamikoana is a species of sea snail, a marine gastropod mollusk in the family Turbinidae, the turban snails.

The subspecies Bolma tamikoana flava Beu & Ponder, 1979 is accepted as Bolma flava Beu & Ponder, 1979

Description
The size of the shell varies between 30 mm and 45 mm.

Distribution
This marine species occurs off Japan, the East China Sea, the South China Sea, Indonesia, the Philippines, in the Central Indo-West Pacific and off Australia (Northern Territory).

References

 Shikama, T. 1973. Descriptions of new marine gastropods from the East and South China Seas. Science Reports of the Yokohama National University 2(20): 1-8 pp., 2 pls
 Wilson, B. 1993. Australian Marine Shells. Prosobranch Gastropods. Kallaroo, Western Australia : Odyssey Publishing Vol. 1 408 pp

External links
 To Encyclopedia of Life
 To World Register of Marine Species
 

tamikoana
Gastropods described in 1973